Kauno diena (Kaunas Daily) is a Lithuanian daily newspaper, printed in Kaunas.

History and profile
In 1998, Kauno diena was bought by Norwegian media giant Orkla Media subsidiary Orkla Press. In December 2006 Orkla sold its media stakes to the investment company Hermis Capital. Its daily circulation in 2005 was about 38,000 copies.

It was formerly known as Tarybų Lietuva (Soviet Lithuania, 1945–1950) and Kauno Tiesa (Kaunas Truth, 1950–1992).

The present editor in chief of Kauno diena is Arūnas Andriuškevičius.

Previous editors
 1945 – Jonas Šimkus
 1945–1950 – Donatas Roda
 1950 – Juozas Chlivickas
 1951–1953 – Povilas Putrimas
 1954–1956 – Julius Čygas
 1956–1958 – V.Norvaiša
 1958–1960 – Juozas Leonavičius
 1960–1987 – Zenonas Baltušnikas
 1987–1998 – Teklė Mačiulienė
 1999–2007 – Aušra Lėka
 2007 – Kęstutis Jauniškis

See also
Eastern Bloc information dissemination

References

External links
 Kauno diena online

Eastern Bloc mass media
Newspapers established in 1945
Newspapers published in Kaunas
Newspapers published in the Soviet Union
Daily newspapers published in Lithuania